CGMI may refer to:
Church of God Mission International
Consentrasi Gerakan Mahasiswa Indonesia